The Executive Systems Problem Oriented Language (ESPOL) is a programming language, a superset of ALGOL 60, that provides abilities of what would later be termed a system programming language or machine oriented high order language (mohol), such as interrupting a processor on a multiprocessing system (the Burroughs large systems were multiprocessor systems). ESPOL was used to write the Master Control Program (MCP) on Burroughs computer systems from the B5000 to the B6700. The single-pass compiler for ESPOL could compile over 250 lines per second.

ESPOL was superseded by NEWP.

References
B5500 ESPOL Reference Manual, 1967
B6500 ESPOL Reference Manual, 1970
B6700/7700 ESPOL Reference Manual, 1972

ALGOL 60 implementation
ALGOL 60 dialect
Burroughs mainframe computers
Systems programming languages
Mainframe computer software